Lepidochrysops auratus is a butterfly in the family Lycaenidae. It is found in Malawi and Zambia. The habitat consists of Brachystegia woodland.

Adults are on wing in December.

References

Butterflies described in 1979
Lepidochrysops